Jan Koops is a retired Dutch football manager who formerly coached Kenyan Premier League sides AFC Leopards and Nairobi City Stars. He also coached lower-tier side Kolongolo FC in Western Kenya. 

After retirement from active coaching, he fully settled in Kenya.

References

1941 births 
Living people
Expatriate football managers in Kenya
Football managers in Kenya
Dutch expatriate sportspeople in Kenya
Dutch football managers
Dutch footballers
Dutch expatriate football managers
A.F.C. Leopards managers